James Groom(e) may refer to:

James Groom (convict)
James Groom (politician), see 67th New York State Legislature
James Groome, politician in Maryland, USA